Aínsa-Sobrarbe (in Aragonese: L'Aínsa-Sobrarbe) is a municipality located in the province of Huesca, Aragon, Spain. As of 2010 (INE), the municipality has a population of 2,180 inhabitants.

Aínsa is the economic development capital of the Sobrarbe comarca.

Villages
Besides the main Aínsa town there are the following villages within its municipal term:
Arcusa 
Arro 
Banastón
Las Bellostas 
Camporrotuno 
Castejón de Sobrarbe 
Castellazo 
Coscojuela de Sobrarbe 
El Coscollar 
Gerbe 
Griébal 
Guaso 
Jabierre de Olsón 
Latorre 
Latorrecilla 
Mondot 
Morillo de Tou 
Olsón 
La Pardina
La Ripa 
Paúles de Sarsa 
Santa María de Buil
Sarratillo 
Sarsa de Surta
Urriales

Uninhabited villages and hamlets
The following formerly populated places are now uninhabited: Bagüeste, Pacinias, Cerollar, Casa Sierra, Casa Linás, Escapa, La Lecina, Linés, La Capana and Puibayeta.

There are also small hamlets that are inhabited only occasionally, like Casa Almunia, Molino López, Molino Villacampa, Molino Jabierre, Sarratiás, Sarrato, Coronillas, Pelegrín and Gabardilla.

Twin towns
 Arreau, France

References

External links 

  
 Villa de Aínsa 
 Pyrenees, Aínsa 
 La Morisma de l'Aínsa